Sydny Grace Nasello (born April 14, 2000) is an American professional soccer player who plays as a forward for Granadilla.

Career

In 2018, Nasello joined South Florida Bulls in the United States.
Before the 2022 season, she was drafted by American side Portland Thorns, but was not signed due to her past Twitter activity. Before the second half of 2021–22, she signed for Spanish side Granadilla. On February 13, 2022, Nasello debuted for Granadila during a 3–1 win over Villarreal. On March 13, 2022, she scored her first goals for Granadila during a 1–0 win over Sevilla.

References

External links
 Sydney Nasello at playmakerstats.com

2000 births
Living people
American expatriate sportspeople in Spain

American women's soccer players
Women's association football forwards
Expatriate women's footballers in Spain
Primera División (women) players
South Florida Bulls women's soccer players
UD Granadilla Tenerife players
United States women's under-20 international soccer players
Portland Thorns FC draft picks